Robert A. Wagenhoffer (July 5, 1960 – December 13, 1999) was an American figure skater. As a single skater, he was the 1977 Nebelhorn Trophy champion, the 1980 NHK Trophy silver medalist, the 1981 Skate America silver medalist, and a two-time U.S. national medalist. Wagenhoffer also competed in pairs with Vicki Heasley, winning silver at the 1979 NHK Trophy, bronze at the 1979 Skate America, and silver at the 1979 Nationals. He retired from amateur competition in 1982, joining the Ice Capades.

Wagenhoffer died in December 1999 from complications of AIDS.

Results

Single skating

Pair skating with Heasley

References 

1960 births
American male single skaters
American male pair skaters
1999 deaths
AIDS-related deaths in California
20th-century American people
21st-century American people